WMEZ (94.1 FM) is a radio station in the Pensacola, Florida, market owned by Cumulus Media Inc. through licensee Cumulus Licensing LLC. It broadcasts an adult contemporary format using the name "Today's Soft Rock 94.1". Its studios are in Pensacola, and its transmitter is near Robertsdale, Alabama.

History
Mello-Tone, Inc., was formed and applied in March 1960 to build a new FM radio station in Pensacola. A construction permit was approved on June 23, 1960, and WPEX-FM began broadcasting on November 11, 1960, with musical programming including classical and standards. The license was acquired by Frederic T. C. Brewer in 1965; Brewer owned an electronics shop and a background music business. WPEX-FM became WMEZ on July 4, 1972, and it continued the beautiful music format for more than 20 years. As late as 1989, it was the highest-rated station in Pensacola.

In February 1997, Brewer sold WMEZ after 31 years to Patterson Broadcasting of Atlanta, its format having shifted to adult contemporary by 1992. Two months later, Patterson Broadcasting agreed to be acquired by Capstar.

Chancellor Media acquired Capstar for $4.1 billion in 1999, changed its name to AMFM, and then merged with Clear Channel Communications in a $23 billion transaction that October. However, WMEZ and WXBM-FM were earmarked for divestiture to resolve antitrust concerns along with 70 other radio stations. Clear Channel initially intended to sell the stations to Urban Radio, which fell apart; instead, Pamal Broadcasting acquired the pair for $43.95 million in October 2000. Pamal then sold the two stations in 2012 to Cumulus Media for $6.5 million, allowing it to focus on its stations in New York state and Vermont.

References

External links

MEZ
Cumulus Media radio stations
1960 establishments in Florida
Radio stations established in 1960